The Minato Bridge is a double-deck cantilever truss bridge in Osaka, Japan; upper deck is for Hanshin Expressway Route 16 Osakako Line, and lower deck is Route 5 Bayshore Line.  It opened in 1974.  It is the third-longest cantilever truss span in the world, behind the Quebec Bridge and the Forth Bridge.

Designs including arch and suspension elements were eliminated from consideration due to poor subsoil conditions of alternating layers of clay and gravel.  Instead, the designers selected a cantilever structure using high-strength steel, to reduce mass.

Construction

See also
Hanshin Expressway

References 

Truss bridges
Buildings and structures in Osaka
Bridges completed in 1974
Transport in Osaka Prefecture
Double-decker bridges